Reikichi Nakamura (born 16 October 1916) was a Japanese speed skater who competed in the 1936 Winter Olympics.

In 1936 he finished eleventh in the 500 metres competition.

External links
Speed skating 1936 

1916 births
Japanese male speed skaters
Speed skaters at the 1936 Winter Olympics
Olympic speed skaters of Japan
Waseda University alumni
Possibly living people